Carleton College is a private liberal arts college in Northfield, Minnesota. Founded in 1866, it had 2,105 undergraduate students and 269 faculty members in fall 2016. The 200-acre main campus is between Northfield and the 800-acre Cowling Arboretum, which became part of the campus in the 1920s.

Admissions is highly selective with an acceptance rate of 16.5% in 2022, and Carleton is annually ranked near the top in most rankings of liberal arts schools. Carleton is particularly renowned for its undergraduate teaching, having been ranked #1 in Undergraduate Teaching by U.S. News & World Report for over a decade.

Students can choose courses from 33 major programs and 31 minor programs and have the option to design their own major. Carleton's varsity sports compete at the NCAA Division III level in the Minnesota Intercollegiate Athletic Conference. Carleton is also known for its ultimate Frisbee team, which has won multiple national championships.

Among liberal arts colleges, Carleton is one of the highest sources of undergraduate students pursuing doctorates per 100 students, and from 2000 through 2016, students and alumni of the college have included 122 National Science Foundation Graduate Fellows, 112 Fulbright Scholars, 22 Watson Fellows, 20 NCAA Postgraduate Scholars, 13 Goldwater Scholars, and 2 Rhodes Scholars.

History
The school was founded in 1866, when the Minnesota Conference of Congregational Churches unanimously accepted a resolution to locate a college in Northfield. Two Northfield businessmen, Charles Augustus Wheaton and Charles Moorehouse Goodsell, each donated  of land for the first campus.  The first students enrolled at the preparatory unit of Northfield College in the fall of 1867. In 1870, the first college president, James Strong, traveled to the East Coast to raise funds for the college. On his way from visiting a potential donor, William Carleton of Charlestown, Massachusetts, Strong was badly injured in a collision between his carriage and a train. Impressed by Strong's survival of the accident, Carleton donated $50,000 to the fledgling institution in 1871. As a result, the Board of Trustees renamed the school, Carleton College, in his honor.

The college graduated its first college class in 1874, James J. Dow and Myra A. Brown, who married each other later that year.

On September 7, 1876, the James-Younger Gang, led by outlaw Jesse James, tried to rob the First National Bank of Northfield. Joseph Lee Heywood, Carleton's Treasurer, was acting cashier at the bank that day. He was shot and killed for refusing to open the safe. Carleton later named a library fund after Heywood. The Heywood Society is the name for a group of donors who have named Carleton in their wills.

In its early years under the presidency of James Strong, Carleton reflected the theological conservatism of its Minnesota Congregational founders. In 1903, modern religious influences were introduced by William Sallmon, a Yale Divinity School graduate, who was hired as college president. Sallmon was opposed by conservative faculty members and alumni, and left the presidency by 1908.  After Sallmon left, the trustees hired Donald J. Cowling, another theologically liberal Yale Divinity School graduate, as his successor. In 1916, under Cowling's leadership, Carleton began an official affiliation with the Minnesota Baptist Convention. It lasted until 1928, when the Baptists severed the relationship as a result of fundamentalist opposition to Carleton's liberalism, including the college's support for teaching evolution. Non-denominational for a number of years, in 1964 Carleton abolished its requirement for weekly attendance at some religious or spiritual meeting.

In 1927, students founded the first student-run pub in the nation, The Cave. Located in the basement of Evans Hall, it continues to host live music shows and other events several times each week.

During World War II, several classes of male students went through air basic training at the college. Since being sold by the college in 1944, the Stanton Airfield has been operated for commercial use. The world premiere production of the English translation of Bertolt Brecht's play, The Caucasian Chalk Circle, was performed in 1948 at Carleton's Little Nourse Theater.

In 1963 the Reformed Druids of North America was founded by students at Carleton, initially as a means to be excused from attendance of then-mandatory weekly chapel service.  Within a few years, the group evolved to engage in legitimate spiritual exploration. Its legacy remains in campus location names such as the Stone Circle (commonly called "the Druid Circle") and the Hill of the Three Oaks. Meetings continue to be held in the Carleton College Cowling Arboretum.

President Bill Clinton gave the last commencement address of his administration at Carleton, on June 10, 2000, marking the first presidential visit to the college.

Academics
Carleton is a small, liberal arts college offering 34 different majors and 39 minors, and is accredited by the Higher Learning Commission. Students also have the option to design their own major. There are ten languages offered: Spanish, French, German, Chinese, Japanese, Russian, Arabic, Latin, Greek, and Hebrew. The academic calendar follows a trimester system where students usually take three classes per 10-week term.

Degree students are required to take an Argument & Inquiry Seminar in their first year, a writing-rich course, three quantitative reasoning encounters (courses in which students work with quantitative data and arguments), language, international studies, intercultural domestic studies, humanistic inquiry, literary/artistic analysis, arts practice, science, formal or statistical reasoning, social inquiry, and physical education.

The average class sizes at Carleton is 16 students.  Carleton is one of the few liberal arts colleges to run on the trimester system. The most popular majors, by 2021 graduates, were:
Biology/Biological Science (52)
Computer Science (47)
Mathematics (34)
International Relations and Affairs (34)
Research and Experimental Psychology (31)
Econometrics and Quantitative Economics (29)
English Language & Literature (26)
History (26)

Studying abroad is common at Carleton: 76% of the senior class of 2018 studied abroad at least once over their four years. Carleton offers a number of its own programs each year, which are led by Carleton faculty and available only to Carleton students. In 2017–2018, 17 such programs were offered. Although many students opt to go on a Carleton-specific program, because full financial aid and academic credits can transfer to other programs, many students choose to study with other schools or organizations.

Admissions

Admission to Carleton has been categorized as "most selective" by U.S. News & World Report. The class of 2025 admittance rate was 17.5% of all applicants, making Carleton the most selective college in Minnesota.

In 2016, 219 of the 647 early decision applicants were accepted (33.8%) and 1,248 of the 5,838 regular decision applicants were accepted (21.4%). A spot on the waitlist was offered to 1,366 applicants, of whom 533 accepted and 2 were ultimately admitted. Enrolling freshmen numbered 567, making the yield rate (the percentage of accepted students who enroll) 38.7%. Of the 197 who applied for transfer admission, none were admitted, which is unusual.

Carleton has a strong history of enrolling students who are in the National Merit Scholarship Program, often enrolling more than any other liberal arts college in the nation. Usually around 16% of the incoming class, the Class of 2021 included 51 National Merit Scholars.

Rankings

Carleton has been in the top 10 liberal arts colleges since 1997 in the U.S. News & World Report rankings. For 2020, it ranks tied for 7th overall, and 1st for "Best Undergraduate Teaching", 9th for "Most Innovative" and 32nd for "Best Value".  In 2019, the Washington Monthly ratings — using criteria of social mobility, research, and service — ranked Carleton the 24th best college in the liberal arts college category. In the 2019 Forbes ranking of 650 American colleges, which combines liberal arts colleges, service academies and national research universities, Carleton is ranked 52nd.

Kiplinger's Personal Finance places Carleton 13th in its 2019 ranking of the 149 best value liberal arts colleges in the United States. Carleton was ranked 5th in the 2015 Brookings Institution list of "Four-Year or Higher Colleges With the Highest Value-Added With Respect to Mid-Career Earnings", with Carleton adding an estimated 43% in value, raising the predicted mid-career salary of $76,236 to $117,700. In a 2012 study of higher education institutions, Carleton was listed as the most chosen as a peer institution, followed by Princeton and Oberlin.

Graduates
Among American liberal arts institutions, Carleton College is one of the highest sources of undergraduate students pursuing doctorates per one hundred students. It has also been recognized for sending a large number of female students to graduate programs in the sciences. In the 2016–2017 school year, 9 Carleton graduates obtained a Fulbright grant from 28 applications. Among liberal arts colleges, the school is a "Top Producer of Fulbright Awards for American Students". To date, Carleton has produced 75 Watson Fellows.

Of those who applied, on average over 75% of Carleton graduates are accepted to medical school and about 90% to law school. Within five years of graduating, between 65% to 75% of graduates pursue postgraduate studies. The 15 most common graduate or professional schools attended by Carleton students are University of Minnesota–Twin Cities, University of Wisconsin–Madison, University of Michigan–Ann Arbor, Harvard, University of Chicago, University of Washington, Columbia, UC Berkeley, Northwestern, NYU, Yale, and Stanford. The most commonly pursued graduate programs are law, medicine, education, business administration, history, and chemistry.

Over 20% of all Carleton graduates since 1990 work in the business/finance/sales sector. Over 10% work in either healthcare or higher education. Pre K-12 education accounts for about 9% of graduates. Carleton graduates with only a bachelor's degree have an average mid-career salary of $113,800, according to self-reported data from PayScale.

Student life

Student body
Carleton typically enrolls about 2,000 students, of which 51% are women and 49% are men.

26.5% of the total student population are domestic students of color, 10.9% are among the first generation in their family to attend college, and 83.5% are U.S. citizens from out of state.

10.2% of students are international, with the most represented countries being China (4.3%), South Korea (0.8%), India (0.7%), Canada (0.7%), and Japan (0.4%).

Extracurricular organizations
The school's nearly 240 active student organizations include three theater boards (coordinating as many as ten productions every term), long-form and short-form improv groups and a sketch comedy troupe, six a cappella groups, four choirs, seven specialized instrumental ensembles, five dance interest groups, two auditioned dance companies, a successful Mock Trial team, a nationally competitive debate program, seven recurring student publications, and the student-run 24-hour KRLX radio station, which employs more than 200 volunteers each term.

In five of the last twelve years, Carleton College students received the Best Delegation award at the World Model United Nations competition. In the 2013–2014 academic year, the school's team ranked among the top 25 in the nation.

The college's format-free student-run radio station, KRLX, founded in 1947 as KARL, was ranked by The Princeton Review as the nation's 4th best college radio station.

Traditions
Carleton has numerous student traditions and a long history of student pranks. These include painting the college's water tower. Notably, a likeness of President Clinton was painted on the tower the night before his commencement speech in 2000. Early the following morning, college maintenance quickly painted over it (although in his speech, Clinton mentioned his amusement and regret it had been covered before he could see it). The administration's view of this particular phenomenon have changed over time. For liability-related reasons, climbing the water tower is now considered a grave infraction.

Friday Flowers and Late Night Breakfast on the eve of exams are other traditions that are popular as of 2021. Since 1990, Carleton students have played "Late Night Trivia", a game show broadcast over the college's radio station, KRLX, during the annual Winter Term exam period. Students compete in teams to identify songs and answer questions as well as participate in a variety of non-trivia challenges, the specifics of which vary greatly year-to-year.

Schiller bust 

A bust of Friedrich Schiller, known simply as "Schiller", has made regular appearances, though briefly, at large campus events. The tradition dates back to 1956, when two students absconded with the bust from Scoville Library during the process of transferring books from there to the new library. "Schiller" resided in their dorm rooms for a period, only to have the bust taken from them in turn. Possession of the bust escalated into an elaborate competition, which took on a high degree of secrecy and strategy.

Schiller's public appearances, accompanied with a cry of "Schiller!", are a tacit challenge to other students to try to capture the bust. The currently circulating bust of Schiller was retrieved from Puebla, Mexico in the summer of 2003. In 2006, students created an online scavenger hunt, made up of a series of complex riddles about Carleton, which led participants to Schiller's hidden location. The bust was stolen from the winner of the scavenger hunt. At commencement in 2006, the holders of the bust arranged for Schiller to "graduate".  When his name was called at the appropriate moment, the bust was pulled from behind the podium and displayed.

In March 2010, the bust of Schiller appeared on The Colbert Report. The appearance was organized by custodians of Schiller who contacted Peter Gwinn, a Carleton alumnus who was a writer for the program. The bust also appeared on a Halloween broadcast of A Prairie Home Companion on Minnesota Public Radio.

Rotblatt
In 1964, Carleton students named an intramural slow-pitch softball league after Marv Rotblatt, a former Chicago White Sox pitcher. Although traditional intramural softball is still played at Carleton, the name "Rotblatt" now refers to a campus-wide annual beer softball game that is played with one inning for every year of the school's over 150-year existence. The game begins at sunrise and lasts until the slated number of innings have been completed for that year. The only rule for gameplay is that in order to participate, all players must have a cup in one hand. In 1997, Sports Illustrated honored Rotblatt in its "Best of Everything" section with the award, "Longest Intramural Event". Rotblatt himself attended the game several times over the course of his life and appreciated the tradition.

Friday Flowers 
A highly visible campus tradition is "Friday Flowers," where students can purchase individual flowers from a local florist and place them in one another's mailboxes each Friday of term. This tradition was in the news after three students died in a car accident en route to a frisbee tournament in 2014. Students at the nearby St. Olaf College sent over Friday Flowers for each student's mailbox. Later that fall, after a St. Olaf student died, Carleton returned the gesture.

Freshman Frisbee Toss 
Every first year student receives a frisbee on their first day of orientation. The design of the disc changes from year to year but always includes a penguin and the graduating year.  At the  Frisbee Toss Ceremony, students write their name on the frisbee, gather on the Bald Spot in a circle and throw their discs. This officially marks the beginning of a student's time at Carleton. After the toss, each new student collects a disc and eventually returns it to the original owner in the hopes of making a new friend.

Campus

The college campus was created in 1867 with the gifts of two  parcels from local businessmen Charles M. Goodsell and Charles Augustus Wheaton. The 1,040-acre school campus is on a hill overlooking the Cannon River, at the northeast edge of Northfield. To the north and east is the 880-acre Cowling Arboretum, which was farm fields in the early years of the college. The area beyond the Arboretum is still largely devoted to agriculture.

The center of campus is an open field called "the Bald Spot," which is used for ultimate frisbee in the warmer months, and flooded to form an ice rink for skating and broomball in the winter. Most of the campus buildings constructed before World War II surround the Bald Spot.

The 1/4-acre Jo Ryo En Japanese Garden is located behind Watson Hall in the center of the campus.

Campus buildings
Several of Carleton's older buildings have been listed on the National Register of Historic Places (NRHP). Willis Hall, the first building on campus, was constructed from 1869 to 1872. Originally the hall contained the men's dormitory, classrooms, library, and chapel. The building was gutted by fire in 1879, after which it was entirely rebuilt within the existing stone shell. The original front of the building became the rear entrance with the construction of Severance Hall in 1928. As new buildings were constructed, various academic departments cycled through the building. Beginning in 1954, Willis served as the college student union, until it was replaced in 1979 by the Sayles-Hill Student Center, a converted gymnasium. Willis Hall now houses the Economics, Political Science, and Educational Studies offices. The college's clock bell tower and the main college flagpole, along with the radio tower for KRLX, are located on the roof.

Goodsell Observatory, also on the NRHP, was constructed in 1887 and at the time was the largest observatory in the state of Minnesota. It was named for Charles Goodsell, who donated land for the campus. From the late 19th century to the end of the World War II, Goodsell Observatory kept the time for every major railroad west of the Mississippi River, including Northern Pacific Railway, the Great Northern Railway, the Chicago, Milwaukee, and St. Paul Railroad, and the St. Paul, Minneapolis and Manitoba Railway. Goodsell served as the headquarters of a state weather service from 1883 to 1886.

Scoville Hall (originally Scoville Memorial Library), completed in 1896, is on the NRHP. Replaced in function by the Gould Library in the 1950s, Scoville was adapted for administrative space.

Four nineteenth-century buildings have been demolished.  Gridley Hall (1882) was the main women's dormitory for many years, and was torn down in 1967 for construction of the Music and Drama Center.  Williams Hall (1880) was the college's first science building; it was demolished in 1961. Seccombe House (1880) was used for music instruction until 1914, and was located near the site of the current Skinner Chapel. The first observatory (1878) was replaced by Goodsell Observatory in 1887, and the old building was demolished in 1905 to make way for Laird Hall.

Laird Hall was built for science classes in 1905; the classical-revival building now houses the English department and administrative offices, including the president's office. Sayles-Hill was built as the first school gymnasium in 1910, and converted to a student center in 1979.

The eclectic styles of the eight buildings that made up the college in 1914, when Donald Cowling became president, were replaced by a uniform Collegiate Gothic style for the nine buildings erected during his tenure. Skinner Memorial Chapel, completed in 1916, is on the NRHP. Three connected western dorms were built for men: Burton Hall (1915), Davis Hall (1923), and Severance Hall (1928), and two residence halls were built for women: Nourse Hall (1917) and Margaret Evans Hall (1927).  Evans Hall was notable for decades for its subdivision into adjacent columns of rooms off stairwells, rather than the more typical arrangement of floors of rooms on hallways.  In the fall of 2012, Evans was heavily refurbished to modernize the internal layout and increase overall occupancy.  Music Hall was built in 1914, and since the construction of the Music & Drama Center in 1967 has been referred to as Old Music Hall. Laird Stadium which stands at the site of the football and track field, was built in 1927. Leighton Hall (1920), originally built for the Chemistry department, now houses academic and administrative offices, including the business office.

The Great Depression and World War II essentially ended the construction boom for two decades. Boliou Hall was built in 1949 in a modernist style, using yellow sandstone as a major element. It was enlarged using a similar style and materials in the early 1990s. The Library was built in 1956 in a similar style, but was expanded in a brick-based style in the mid 1980s.  It was renamed the Gould Memorial Library in 1995 for former President Larry Gould. Musser and Myers Halls were built in 1958 as men's and women's dorms respectively, in a bare-bones modernist brick style.

Minoru Yamasaki, architect of the Northwestern National Life Building in Minneapolis and of the original New York World Trade Center, designed five buildings at Carleton in the 1960s. Olin Hall of Science (1961) has a distinctive "radiator" grill work on the exterior. Goodhue (1962) and Watson (1966) Halls were built as dormitories. At seven floors, Watson is the tallest building on campus. The West Gym (1964) and Cowling Gym (1965) were built to replace Sayles-Hill for indoor athletic facilities, originally for men and women respectively.

Carleton built a new  Recreation Center in 2000.  A full indoor fieldhouse is located above a fitness center, which includes a climbing wall and bouldering wall.

In the fall of 2011, the Weitz Center for Creativity opened up in a renovated middle school.  The Center includes a cinema and a live theater, and is the new home of the Cinema and Media Studies (CAMS) department, and the associated recording and production studios.  It is also the home of Presentation, Event and Production Services (PEPS).

Cowling Arboretum

The Cowling Arboretum, "the Arb", was initially created from lands purchased in the 1920s by President Donald J. Cowling. As the college was having difficult financial times, it was first called "Cowling's Folly" but later became his legacy. After Carleton Farm was closed, its acreage was added to the Arboretum.

Since 1970 acreage has been removed from cultivation in sections. The Arboretum is divided by Minnesota Highway 19 into the larger Lower Arb to the north (so-called because it includes the Cannon River valley) and the smaller Upper Arb. Pedestrian trails are located throughout the Arboretum, as well as the school's cross-country running and skiing courses, and a paved mixed-use bicycle/running trail in the Upper Arb.

Sustainability
The College Sustainability Report Card, which evaluated 200 colleges and universities with the largest endowments in the United States and Canada, Carleton received a grade of A−, earning the award of "Overall College Sustainability Leader". A wind turbine located near the campus generates the equivalent of up to 40 percent of Carleton's electrical energy use; it is configured to sell this power back to the local grid for the most efficient use system wide. In late 2011, Carleton installed a second wind turbine that provides power directly to the campus, providing more than 25 percent of the college's electrical energy use.

Athletics

The Carleton athletic teams are called the Knights. The college is a member of the Division III level of the National Collegiate Athletic Association (NCAA), primarily competing in the Minnesota Intercollegiate Athletic Conference (MIAC) since the 1983–84 academic year; which they were a member on a previous stint from 1920–21 to 1924–25.  The Knights previously competed in the Midwest Conference (MWC) from 1925–26 to 1982–83; although Carleton had dual conference membership with the MWC and the MIAC between 1921–22 and 1924–25. All students must participate in physical education or athletic activities to fulfill graduation requirements.

Carleton competes in 20 intercollegiate varsity sports (10 for men and 10 for women): Men's sports include baseball, basketball, cross country, football, golf, soccer, swimming, tennis and track & field; while women's sports include basketball, cross country, golf, soccer, softball, swimming, tennis, track & field and volleyball.

Rivalries
Carleton's biggest athletic rival is St. Olaf College, located on the other side of Northfield. The Knights and the Oles contest six trophies in yearly matchups. The first trophy, The Goat, was created in 1913 and goes to the winning men's basketball team.

Accomplishments
Carleton won its first and only team national title in 1980 when the men's cross country team won the NCAA division three cross country national championship.

Club sports
The student-run Ultimate clubs have had the national success; the school's top men's team, Carleton Ultimate Team (CUT), and women's team, Syzygy, are perennial national contenders in the USA Ultimate College Division I tournaments. CUT has qualified annually for nationals since 1989, and won the National Championship in 2001, 2009, 2011, and 2017. Syzygy has qualified for women's nationals all but one year since 1987, and won the National Championship in 2000. The other men's Ultimate team, the Gods of Plastic, won the 2010 and 2012 College Division III Open National Championships, and the other women's Ultimate team, Eclipse, won the College Division III Women's nationals in 2011, 2016, and 2017. Carleton founded the first women's rugby club in the state of Minnesota in 1978 and went on to win the Division III National Championship in 2011.

In popular culture
Pamela Dean set her fantasy novel Tam Lin (1991) at a fictional "Blackstock College", based on Dean's alma mater, Carleton. Dean's author's note begins, "Readers acquainted with Carleton College will find much that is familiar to them in the architecture, landscape, classes, terminology, and general atmosphere of Blackstock." Blackstock's buildings were given names that reference their counterparts at Carleton (e.g. Watson Hall becomes Holmes Hall, referring to Sherlock Holmes; Burton Hall becomes Taylor Hall, referring to the marriages of Richard Burton and Elizabeth Taylor).

The educational video game series The Oregon Trail was initially created by three Carleton students.

The 1996 film D3: The Mighty Ducks was partially filmed on Carleton's campus.

Ben Wyatt, a character from NBC's Parks and Recreation, graduated from Carleton with a Bachelor of Arts in Political Science.

Notable alumni and faculty

Notable graduates of Carleton College include economist Thorstein Veblen (1880), US Supreme Court Justice Pierce Butler (1887), management scholar and founder of servant-leadership Robert K. Greenleaf (1926), research chemist Ray Wendland (1933), pioneer in women's abortion rights Jane Elizabeth Hodgson (1934), US Secretary of Defense Melvin R. Laird (1942), Intelligence Officer John J. Hicks (1943), NBC television journalist and Meet the Press host Garrick Utley (1961), geologist Walter Alvarez (1962), chemist Robert G. Bergman (1963), geneticist and discoverer of BRCA1 Mary-Claire King (1967), European historian Lynn Hunt (1967), historian of American sexuality and gender Kathy Peiss (1975), bestselling author of thriller novels Lincoln Child (1979), dean and law professor Margaret Raymond (1982), astrobiologist and president of METI (Messaging Extraterrestrial Intelligence) Douglas Vakoch (1983), co-founder of the Broad Institute and Harvard Medical School professor Todd Golub (1985), editor-in-chief of Politico John F. Harris (1985), two time Pulitzer Prize winning historian T.J. Stiles (1986), editor of Mother Jones magazine Clara Jeffery (1989), American journalist and television personality Jonathan Capehart (1990), children's television host Chris Kratt (1992), award-winning speculative fiction writer and blogger Naomi Kritzer (1995), climber and Academy Award-winning filmmaker Jimmy Chin (1996), singer-songwriter Laura Veirs (1997), writer Aisha Sabatini Sloan (2003), professional basketball player Freddie Gillespie (2017), and nutrition researcher Genevieve Stearns.

Notable faculty have included Ian Barbour, winner of the 1999 Templeton Prize for Progress in Religion; Laurence McKinley Gould, Antarctic explorer; Burton Levin, US Ambassador to Burma (1987-1990); and Paul Wellstone, U.S. Senator from Minnesota 1991–2002.

Summer programs
Carleton runs the Summer Liberal Arts Institute in the summers.

Points of interest
 Carleton College Cowling Arboretum
 Goodsell Observatory
 The Cave
 Weitz Center for Creativity
 Willis Hall

See also
 List of colleges and universities in Minnesota

References

External links

 
 Official athletics website

 
Liberal arts colleges in Minnesota
Education in Rice County, Minnesota
Educational institutions established in 1866
Buildings and structures in Rice County, Minnesota
Tourist attractions in Rice County, Minnesota
Private universities and colleges in Minnesota
1866 establishments in Minnesota
Universities and colleges accredited by the Higher Learning Commission